Kevin Tsai (born 1 March 1962) is a Taiwanese television host and writer. He co-hosts Chung T'ien Television's Kangsi Coming with hostess Dee Hsu.

Early life
Tsai was born to a wealthy family. His father was a well known lawyer and his family was briefly in the shipping business. Tsai went to private schools for his pre–bachelor education, and he entered Tunghai University to study foreign language in 1984.

Career
In 1990, Kevin Tsai graduated from UCLA School of Theater, Film and Television with a Master Degree in TV Production and moved back to Taiwan. He began working as the director of Voice of Taipei Radio Station, and later on the Chief Editor of GQ – Taiwan. In 2004, Tsai was joined by his fellow hostess Dee Hsu in hosting the TV program KangXi Lai Le and his popularity skyrocketed from his style and banter. Tsai has also been frequenting the Golden Horse Film Festival and Awards. Partnered with Carol Cheng(2 times), Patty Hou(1 time)  and Lin Chi-ling(1 time), Kevin Tsai has been presenting the award show since 2001. Tsai is also a writer. He has written seven different books and many of them became Taiwan's bestsellers as well as writing comedy material in his popular talk show.

In October 2015, Tsai and Dee Hsu both announced to end their hosting duties of their show to move on to other commitments. Their final show was taped in December 2015 and broadcast in January 2016.

After the show ended, Tsai wrote and directed his first feature film, Didi's Dream, with Hsu as the lead in a dual role. Tsai said the film was a passion project and made for supporters of his and Hsu's talk show.

Personal life
Tsai is openly gay. During a program hosted by Li Ao in 2002, Kevin Tsai openly acknowledged his sexual orientation while pointing out that there was still much work to be done in Taiwan's LGBT social movements.

Bibliography
Tsai has written seven books, including:

, published 1996
, published 1996
Those brilliant things the guys gave to me, published 2004

Filmography

Film

Hosting

Awards ceremony

Variety show

Music video appearances

Awards & nominations

Golden Bell Awards

|-
| rowspan=2 |2003
| Zhen Qing Zhi Shu
| Best Host in a Culture & Education Programme
| 
|-
| rowspan=3 |Two Generation Company
| rowspan=7 |Best Host in a Variety Programme
| 
|-
| 2004
| 
|-
| rowspan=2 |2005
| 
|-
| rowspan=4 |Kangsi Coming  (康熙来了)
|
|-
| 2006
|
|-
|2007
|
|-
|2008
|

References

External links
 Kevin Tsai's Sina Microblog （蔡康永 新浪微博）
 KangXi Lai Le’s Official Website
 Kevin Tsai related Videos on YouTube

1962 births
Living people
Tunghai University alumni
University of California, Los Angeles alumni
Taiwanese LGBT writers
Taiwanese television personalities
Taiwanese film directors
Taiwanese screenwriters
Writers from Taipei
Gay writers
Taiwanese LGBT broadcasters
20th-century Taiwanese writers
21st-century Taiwanese writers
LGBT film directors